The PFF National Challenge Cup is an annual knockout football competition in men's domestic Pakistani football within the Pakistan football league system. It is organized by and named after the Pakistan Football Federation.

Khan Research Laboratories have won the most titles (six). WAPDA are the current champions, winning the 2020 edition courtesy of a 1-0 win against SSGC F.C. in the final.

Background
Although it is an annual competition, it has not been held on a few occasions. The competition was not held from (1980–83, 1986, 1988–89, 1995, 1997, 2004, 2006–07, 2017, 2021–22).
The tournament has seen various name changes throughout its establishment.

Names

Finals

Wins by club

Results by team
Since its establishment, the National Challenge Cup has been won by 15 different teams. Teams shown in italics are no longer in existence.

Giant killings
The possibility of unlikely victories in the earlier rounds of the competition, where lower ranked teams beat higher placed opposition in what is known as a "giant killing", is much anticipated by the public. Such upsets are considered an integral part of the tradition and prestige of the competition, and the attention gained by giant-killing teams can be as great as that for winners of the cup.

In 2009, non-league side Sindh Government Press defeated top-flight National Bank 3–2 in group stages. In 2011, second-division club Ashraf Sugar Mills defeated Pakistan Premier League winners WAPDA F.C. 1–0, and they repeated the feat again in the group stages, defeating National Bank from Pakistan Premier League 2–0, as they finished top of the group. In 2012, second-division side Pakistan Public Work Department defeated Pakistan Air Force 2–0 in group stages. In 2013, Pak Afghan Clearing defeated league winners and defending champions Khan Research Laboratories 2–1.

Records and statistics

Final

Team
Most wins: 6, Khan Research Laboratories (2009, 2010, 2011, 2012, 2015, 2016)
Most consecutive wins:  4, Khan Research Laboratories (2009, 2010, 2011, 2012)
Most consecutive/uninterrupted years as National Football Challenge Cup Champions: 6, Sindh Government Press (1979–1984)
Most Final appearances without ever winning: 4, K-Electric (2011, 2012, 2013, 2014)
Most Final appearances without ever losing: 4, Khan Research Laboratories (2009, 2010, 2011, 2012)
Most Final appearances without losing (streak): 4, Khan Research Laboratories (2009, 2010, 2011, 2012)
 Longest gap between wins: 20 years, National Bank (1993–2013)
Biggest win: 4 goals, Khan Research Laboratories 4–0 Pakistan Navy (2010)
Most goals in a final: 4, joint record:
Allied Bank 3–1 Pakistan Army (1996)
Pakistan Navy 3–1 Khan Research Laboratories (2008)
Khan Research Laboratories 4–0 Pakistan Navy (2010)
Pakistan Air Force 3–1 K-Electric (2014)
Most defeats: 4, joint record:
K-Electric (2011, 2012, 2013, 2014)
WAPDA F.C. (1984, 2002, 2005, 2018)

Individual
Most wins by manager: 4, Tariq Lutfi (Khan Research Laboratories) (2011, 2012, 2015, 2016),
Most goals (one final): 2, joint record:
Sajjad Ahmed (Pakistan Navy) (2008)
Izharullah Khan (Khan Research Laboratories) (2015)
Most finals scored in: 2, joint record:
Haroon Yousaf (Allied Bank) (1 each in 1996 & 1998)
Muhammad Mujahid (Pakistan Air Force) (1 each in 2014 & 2018)
Most goals scored: 23, Muhammad Rasool

All rounds
Biggest win: City Football Club 2–18 Wohaib (2005)
Biggest away win: City Football Club 2–18 Wohaib (2005)
Most clubs competing for trophy in a season: 28 (2020)
Longest penalty shootout: 5 penalties each, Allied Bank v. Khan Research Laboratories (1999; Allied Bank won 5–4)
Most rounds played in a season: 3, for:
Bhatti United (2016: Qualifying Round – Knockout stages, 1st–3rd Rounds)
Karachi United (2016: Qualifying Round – Knockout stages, 1st–3rd Rounds)
Sui Southern Gas (2016: Qualifying Round – Knockout stages, 1st–3rd Rounds)
Most games played in a season: 7, Karachi United (2016: three matches Qualifying Group stages, three Proper Group stages, one Quarter-finals)
Fastest goal: 52 seconds, Tariq Badal (for Gwadar Port Authority v. K-Electric, Group Stages, 13 March 2012)
Most consecutive games without defeat: 25, Khan Research Laboratories (Group Stages, 2010 through Group stage, 2013. Won three National Football Challenge Cup.) 
Most consecutive games without defeat: 25, Khan Research Laboratories (Group Stages, 2010 through Group stage, 2013. Won three National Football Challenge Cup.) 
Fastest hat-trick: 5 minutes 51 sec, Umair Ali (for Higher Education Commission v. DFA Bahawalpur, Group Stages, 19 May 2013)
Most goals by a player in a single National Challenge Cup season: 10, Muhammad Rasool (for K-Electric, 2012.
Most goals by a player in a single National Challenge Cup game: 6, joint-record:
Kaleemullah Khan (for Khan Research Laboratories in 8–0 defeat of Ashraf Sugar Mills, Group Stages, 16 May 2013)
Umair Ali (for Higher Education Commission v. DFA Bahawalpur, Group Stages, 19 May 2013)
Muhammad Waheed (for Civil Aviation Authority v. Pakistan Railways, Group stage, 22 July 2019)

References

 
Football competitions in Pakistan
National association football cups